Dichomeris antizella is a moth in the family Gelechiidae. It was described by Viette in 1986. It is found in Madagascar.

The wingspan is about 14 mm.

References

Moths described in 1986
antizella